Mortier Bay (or Little Mortier Bay) is a natural bay on the Burin Peninsula on the south coast of the island of Newfoundland in the province of Newfoundland and Labrador, Canada. The settlement of Marystown is located on the bay.

References
 This article includes text incorporated from United States Hydrographic Office & R. G. Davenport's "Newfoundland and Labrador: The coast and banks of Newfoundland and the coast of Labrador, from Grand Point to the Koksoak River, with the adjacent islands and banks" (1884), a publication now in the public domain.

Bays of Newfoundland and Labrador